Va ska man ta livet av sig för när man ändå inte får höra snacket efteråt? (English: Why take one's life when one can't even hear the chat afterwards?) is a 1977 studio album by Swedish pop and rock artist Magnus Uggla. It was made available as his third studio album in September 1977. The song "Jag skiter" ("I Don't Give a Damn") became a smash hit. The song "Balladen om 70-talets största rockband" ("The Ballad of the Greatest Rock Band of the '70s") is about a Mott the Hoople concert Magnus Uggla attended in 1971. The song "Varning på stan" ("Danger Downtown") became Uggla's first hit single and was later recorded in English with the name "Hit the Girls on the Run". Uggla has stated that he was inspired by Mott the Hoople's song "All the Way from Memphis" when he wrote "Varning på stan". "Jazzgossen" is a Karl Gerhard cover. The album was produced by the artist himself and his longtime partner Anders Henriksson.

The album was rereleased to CD in 1989.

Track listing

Side one
 "Vår tid" – 1977 ("Our Time - 1977") - 4.19
 "Varning på stan" ("Warning in the city") - 4.35
 "Balladen om 70-talets största rockband" ("Ballad of the Greatest Rock Band of the 70's") - 3.40
 "Jag skiter" ("I Don't Give a Damn") - 3.23
 "Dörrslusk" - ("Doorscum") 3.38

Side two
 "På turné" ("On Tour") - 2.55
 "Ja just du ska va gla" ("Yes, Just You Should Be Glad") - 4.26
 "Varit kär" ("Been in Love") - 5.27
 "Jazzgossen" ("The Jazz Boy") - 2.46
 "Ge livet en chans" ("Give Life a Chance") - 3.00
 
As bonus tracks, the first edition of the vinyl album contained a 7-inch vinyl with the songs "Va ska man ta livet av sig för när man ändå inte får höra snacket efteråt" and "Yeh, Why not".

Singles
Two singles were also released

Varning på stan
Varning på stan
Draget (From Magnus Ugglas 1976 album Livets teater)

Ja just du ska va gla
Ja just du ska va gla
Ge livet en chans

Contributing musicians
Arranged by Anders “Henkan” Henriksson
Backing vocals: Magnus Uggla, Anders Henriksson
Bass: Backa Hans Eriksson, jan Bergman, Mike Watson
Drums: Rolf Alex, Janne Guldbäck
Engineer Lasse Gustavsson 
Rhythm guitar: Peter Lundblad
Lead guitars: Lasse Wellander 
Lead vocals: Magnus Uggla
Piano: Anders Henriksson
Saxophone: Janne Kling
Synthesizer [Arp]: Magnus Uggla
Magnus Uggla plays the piano on "Jag skiter".

Charts

References 

1977 albums
Magnus Uggla albums
Swedish-language albums